BC Mažeikiai is a professional basketball club based in Mažeikiai, Lithuania. It currently plays in the NKL.

BC Mažeikiai was founded in 2005 by Mažeikiai government and various businessmen. In 2013, Mažeikiai finished as champions of the National Basketball League and consequently should have been promoted to LKL, the top basketball league in Lithuania. However Mažeikiai had to stay in NKL because they do not have LKL arena–passing requirements, winning a second NKL title. They debuted in the LKL in 2014. They were relegated back to the NKL next season after a disastrous season.

Current roster

References

External links
 BC Mažeikiai NKLsmscredit.lt

Mazeikiai
Sport in Mažeikiai
Basketball teams established in 2005
2005 establishments in Lithuania
National Basketball League (Lithuania) teams
Organizations based in Mažeikiai